Denis Andreyevich Osokin (born 14 November 2002) is a Russian football player. He plays for FC Dynamo Moscow.

Club career
He made his debut for FC Dynamo Moscow on 31 August 2022 in a Russian Cup game against FC Rostov.

Career statistics

References

External links
 
 
 
 

2002 births
Living people
Russian footballers
Association football defenders
FC Dynamo Moscow players
Russian Second League players